Transcona is a provincial electoral division in the Canadian province of Manitoba. The riding was created by redistribution in 1968, and has formally existed since the 1969 provincial election.

The riding is named after and contains Transcona, a neighbourhood in the easternmost tip of the city of Winnipeg. It is bordered to the west by Radisson, Southdale, and St. Boniface, and in all other directions by the rural riding of Springfield-Ritchot.

The population in 1996 was 19,648. The average family income in 1999 was $50,089, with an unemployment rate of 6.70%. There is a significant Ukrainian Canadian population in the riding, about 7% of the total.

The riding is primarily working-class, and includes the Canadian National Railway rail yards. Fifteen percent of the riding's industry is in the manufacturing sector, with a further 14% in retail trade.

The former New Democratic Party (NDP) party leader Russell Paulley represented the riding for eight years. Candidates from the NDP have won Transcona in all but two of the provincial elections (1988 and 2016, both of which coincided with large provincewide declines in NDP support) in which it has participated since 1969.

Members of the Legislative Assembly

Electoral results

 
|Progressive Conservative
|Bill Omiucke
| style="text-align:right;" |2,270
| style="text-align:right;" |23.94

Previous boundaries

References

Manitoba provincial electoral districts
Politics of Winnipeg